Laâyoune is a delineated province in the north-west of Moroccan economic region of Laâyoune-Sakia El Hamra, which is situated within the northern part of the disputed territory of Western Sahara. Its population in 2004 was 210,023 (when it still included the population of the new Tarfaya Province, created in 2009). In today's limits of the province the population was 199,603. Its main town is Laayoune.

Subdivisions
The province is divided administratively into the following:

Since 2009, the following communes have been separated into the Tarfaya Province: The municipality of Tarfaya, and the rural communes of El Hagounia, Akhfenir, Daoura, and Tah.

References

 
Laâyoune Province